Clathromangelia granum is a species of sea snail, a marine gastropod mollusk in the family Raphitomidae.

Description
The shell grows to a length of 7 mm. The shell is conspicuously latticed with coarse sculpture. The aperture is large and truncate at the yellowish white base. They reproduce sexually.

Distribution
This species occurs in European waters and in the Mediterranean Sea off Italy and Morocco.

References

 Philippi R. A., 1844: Enumeratio molluscorum Siciliae cum viventium tum in tellure tertiaria fossilium, quae in itinere suo observavit. Vol. 2  Eduard Anton, Halle [Halis Saxorum] iv + 303 p., pl. 13–28 
 Oliverio M., 1995: The systematics of the radula-less gastropod Clathromangelia (Caenogastropoda, Conoidea); Zoologica Scripta 24(3): 193–201
 Gofas, S.; Le Renard, J.; Bouchet, P. (2001). Mollusca, in: Costello, M.J. et al. (Ed.) (2001). European register of marine species: a check-list of the marine species in Europe and a bibliography of guides to their identification. Collection Patrimoines Naturels, 50: pp. 180–213

External links
 
  Bouchet P., Kantor Yu.I., Sysoev A. & Puillandre N. (2011) A new operational classification of the Conoidea. Journal of Molluscan Studies 77: 273–308

granum